Marino H. "The Godfather" Casem (June 23, 1934 – April 25, 2020) was an American college football coach and athletic administrator.  He served as the head coach at Alabama State University (1963), Alcorn State University (1964–1985), and Southern University (1987–1988, 1992), compiling a career record of 159–93–8.  Casem's Alcorn State Braves teams won four black college national championships and seven Southwestern Athletic Conference (SWAC) titles.  Casem also served as the athletic director at Alcorn State from 1966 to 1986 and at Southern from 1986 to 1999.  He was inducted into the College Football Hall of Fame in 2003.

Biography
Casem was born in Memphis, Tennessee in 1934.  From 1952 to 1956, he attended Xavier University of Louisiana, a historically black Roman Catholic university in New Orleans.

Casem became the head football coach at Alabama State University in 1963 and compiled a record there of 2–8.  In 1964, Casem was hired as the head football coach at Alcorn State University, a historically black college located in Lorman, Mississippi.  He served as the head football coach for 22 years from 1964 to 1985.  He was also Alcorn State's athletic director from 1966 to 1986.  During Casem's tenure, Alcorn State won seven Southwestern Athletic Conference (SWAC) football championships and four black college football national championships.  In 1984, Casem led Alcorn State to a perfect 9–0 regular season.  The team was ranked No. 1 in the final NCAA Division I-AA poll, the first time a black college had ever finished the regular football season in that position.  Casem compiled a record of 138–71–8 (86–48–7 in the SWAC), making him the all-time winningest coach in Alcorn State history.   As Alcorn State's athletic director, Casem also oversaw 13 regular season men's basketball titles and three regular season women's basketball championships.  In 1979, Alcorn State's men's basketball team became the first historically black university to capture a win in the National Invitational Tournament. He also led the effort to build the Davey L. Whitney Arena, and was instrumental in the design and planning of the school's football stadium.

In 1986, Casem resigned from Alcorn State to become the athletic director at Southern University, a historically black college located in Baton Rouge, Louisiana. He was also the head football coach in 1987 and 1988 and interim coach in 1992.  In his three years as football coach, his teams compiled a 19–14 record (12–9 in the SWAC).   He served as Southern's athletic director for 13 years from 1986 to 1999.  During Casem's tenure, Southern won six of the first seven SWAC Commissioner's Cup awards, given to the most accomplished institution in the conference.  In April 1999, Casem announced he would resign at the end of June 1999 at age 65.

Casem also served for many years on the NCAA's Football Rules Committee and Executive Committee. He was inducted into the College Football Hall of Fame in 2003. He has also been inducted into the SWAC Hall of Fame, Alcorn State Hall of Honor, and Mississippi Sports Hall of Fame, and has received the National Football Foundation Outstanding Contribution to Amateur Football Award and the Football Writers Association Citation of Honor.  Casem is credited with saying, "On the East Coast, football is a cultural experience. In the Midwest, it's a form of cannibalism. On the West Coast, it's a tourist attraction. And in the South, football is a religion, and Saturday is the holy day."

In 1999, he also received the 28th NACDA/NIT Athletics Directors Award for his contribution to the sport of basketball and the National Invitational Tournament.  On receiving the award, Casem said, "That you have seen fit to recognize me with this most hallowed award is, in essence, not just a tribute to me, but a tribute to all of the historically black colleges and universities, the many talented student-athletes, the outstanding coaches, motivated staff members, distinguished administrators and supportive fans who stood in our corner."

Casem died April 25, 2020.

Head coaching record

Source:

References

External links
 

1934 births
2020 deaths
Alabama State Hornets football coaches
Alcorn State Braves and Lady Braves athletic directors
Alcorn State Braves football coaches
Southern Jaguars and Lady Jaguars athletic directors
Southern Jaguars football coaches
College Football Hall of Fame inductees
Xavier University of Louisiana alumni
Sportspeople from Memphis, Tennessee
African-American coaches of American football
African-American college athletic directors in the United States
Coaches of American football from Tennessee
20th-century African-American sportspeople
21st-century African-American sportspeople